The bharal (Pseudois nayaur), also called the blue sheep, is a caprine native to the high Himalayas. It is the only member of the genus Pseudois. It occurs in India, Bhutan, China (in Gansu, Ningxia, Sichuan, Tibet, and Inner Mongolia), Myanmar, Nepal, and Pakistan. The Helan Mountains of Ningxia have the highest concentration of bharal in the world, with 15 bharals per km2 and 30,000 in total.

Its native names include yanyang (岩羊) in Mandarin, bharal, barhal, bharar, and bharut in Hindi, na or sna in Tibetan and Ladakh, nabo in Spitian, naur in Nepali and na or gnao in Bhutan.
The bharal was also the focus of George Schaller and Peter Matthiessen's expedition to Nepal in 1973. Their personal experiences are well documented by Matthiessen in his book, The Snow Leopard. The bharal is a major prey of the snow leopard.

Description
Males are slightly larger than females. Dense coat is slate grey in colour, sometimes with a bluish sheen. The underparts and backs of the legs are white, while the chest and fronts of the legs are black. Separating the grey back and white belly is a charcoal-colored stripe. The ears are small, and the bridge of the nose is dark. The horns are found in both sexes and are ridged on the upper surface. In males, they grow upwards, then turn sideways and curve backward, looking somewhat like an upside-down mustache.

Taxonomy and evolution
Chinese blue sheep, Pseudois nayaur szechuanensis
Himalayan blue sheep, P. n. nayaur
Helan Shan blue sheep, P. n. ssp.

Dwarf blue sheep 

The dwarf blue sheep or dwarf bharal (formerly described as Pseudois schaeferi), also known as rong-na in Tibetan, was an alleged species of Pseudois endemic to Sichuan-Tibet in China. It apparently inhabited low, arid, grassy slopes of the upper Yangtze gorge in Batang County of the Sichuan Province, and a small part of the Tibet Autonomous Region. It was recorded as differing from the bharal primarily in size, with adult males weighing around 35 kg (half as much as the bharal), less sexual dimorphism occurring in the species, and females of the two species being very similar. Its coat was described as a steely grey with a silvery sheen, with darker general colouration than the bharal, and the horns of the male were smaller, thinner and more upright, with no inward curl. There were only 200 individuals estimated to be alive in 2000, which prompted the IUCN (classifying it as a subspecies of P. nayaur, as P. n. schaeferi) classified it as Endangered.

However, a 2012 genetic analysis of Chinese bharal found no indication that it was either a distinct species or subspecies, instead finding to be a morphologically distinct variant of P. n. szechuanensis. The American Society of Mammalogists also follows these results, considering P. schaeferi to be conspecific with P. nayaur.

Behaviour and ecology

Bharal are active throughout the day, alternating between feeding and resting on the grassy mountain slopes. Due to their excellent camouflage and the absence of cover in their environment, bharal remain motionless when approached. Once they have been noticed, however, they scamper up to the precipitous cliffs, where they once again freeze, using camouflage to blend into the rock face. Population densities in Nepal were found to be 0.9–2.7 animals per km2, increasing to a maximum of 10 animals in the winter, as herds congregate in valleys.
Bharal are mainly grazers, but during times of scarcity of grass, they switch to browsers, eating herbs and shrubs. A high degree of diet overlap between livestock (especially donkeys) and bharal, together with density-dependent forage limitation, results in resource competition and a decline in bharal density. Where they overlap, they are the favored prey of snow leopards, Himalayan wolves, and leopards, with a few lambs falling prey to foxes or eagles.

Rutting behaviour
The rutting of the bharal starts towards late November and continues until mid-January. During the rut, male bharal use multiple strategies for mating, namely tending, blocking, and coursing. Their lambs are born in late June and July.

Threats
The bharal is categorised as Least Concern by the International Union for Conservation of Nature. The population faces threats - poaching for meat and competition with livestock. Poaching, however, is uncommon due to the unsuitable conditions of its habitat. Similarly, livestock do not generally frequent the mountainous regions where bharal occur; even if they do coexist, no notable detrimental effect on the bharal has been observed.

Relationship with humans
Many Buddhist monasteries protect the bharal found around them, but lately, issues of crop damage caused by bharal have started to arise in areas such as the Spiti Valley.

References

Further reading
 
 Namgail, T., van Wieren, S.E., Mishra, C. & Prins, H.H.T. (2010). Multi-spatial co-distribution of the endangered Ladakh urial and blue sheep in the arid Trans-Himalayan Mountains. Journal of Arid Environments, 74:1162-1169.
 Namgail, T., Mishra, C., de Jong, C. B., van Wieren, S.E. & Prins, H.H.T. (2009). Effects of herbivore species richness on blue sheep niche dynamics and distribution in the Indian Trans-Himalaya. Diversity and Distributions, 15:940-947.
 
 
 
 
 Shrestha, R., Wegge, P. & Koirala, R. A. (2005). Summer diets of wild and domestic ungulates in Nepal Himalaya. Journal of Zoology (London), 266: 111 – 119.

External links

Photos and further information
 Bharal at Animal Diversity Web

Caprids
Mammals of Asia
 
Taxa named by Brian Houghton Hodgson
Fauna of the Himalayas
Mammals described in 1833
Mammals of Nepal